Beech Creek is a stream in the U.S. state of West Virginia.

Beech Creek was named for the beech trees along its course.

See also
List of rivers of West Virginia

References

Rivers of Logan County, West Virginia
Rivers of West Virginia